Michael Richard Lewis Wooldridge (born 7 November 1956) is an Australian doctor, company director, and former politician. He served as deputy leader of the Liberal Party from 1993 to 1994, under John Hewson. In the Howard Government he held ministerial office as Minister for Health and Family Services (1996–1998) and Health and Aged Care (1998–2001). He represented the Liberals in the House of Representatives as the member for Chisholm (1987–1998) and Casey (1998–2001).

Early years
Wooldridge was born in Melbourne on 7 November 1956. He attended Scotch College, Melbourne, and Monash University's medical school, from where he graduated in 1981.

Federal political career
During his time in Opposition he was Deputy Leader of the Liberal Party and therefore the Deputy Leader of the Opposition from March 1993 to May 1994. He was 36 years old when he became deputy opposition leader, becoming the youngest person to hold the position. In May 1994, Liberal Leader John Hewson called a spill for both the leader's and deputy's positions. Hewson lost to Alexander Downer while Wooldridge withdrew at the last minute as it became clear he did not have the numbers to beat Downer's running mate Peter Costello.

Wooldridge's demise as deputy leader came as a result of an opinion poll that showed only 4% of voters preferred him as Liberal leader despite Wooldridge himself stating he had no desire to become leader. In response to this poll, Wooldridge argued on The 7.30 Report that 4% was a good result for a deputy leader as the deputy leader was not meant to be an alternative leader. Ironically, the man who would replace Wooldridge as deputy leader, Peter Costello, not only did not succeed in his ambitions to become leader but also became the party's longest-serving deputy leader.

As well as expressing no desire to become leader, Wooldridge as deputy leader did not request to become Shadow Treasurer, making him one of a few and to date, the last deputy Liberal leader who never held the Treasury portfolio either in government or in opposition.

Wooldridge's reason for not taking up Treasury was his belief that his strength was in social policy area and that Treasury would take him "a year to get up to speed."

In 1996, the Liberal and National Parties were elected to Government and Wooldridge served as Minister for Health and Family Services from 1996 to 1998 and Minister for Health and Aged Care from 1998 up to his retirement in 2001. During his last term, he transferred from his marginal seat of Chisholm to the somewhat friendlier seat of Casey.

During this time he instituted significant and widespread changes to general practice. By setting up and responding to the report:  "General Practice, Responding to the Future With Partnerships", he commenced a reform process that cemented the divisions of general practice as change agents, took responsibility for training GPs away from the RACGP and into the hands of an independent body (General Practice Education and Training), and instituted the Practice Incentives Program.   He was forced to make a public apology to the President of the Australian Medical Association at the time, Kerryn Phelps in 2001 for publicly claiming she had no medical qualifications. During Woolridge's term as Health Minister, he was criticised for having close links with multinational drug company, Pfizer that impacted the independence of the Pharmaceutical Benefits Advisory Committee (PBAC). Wooldridge was also criticised for appointing Pat Clear, a former executive of Glaxo-Wellcome Australia who had recently retired as head of Medicines Australia (then known as the Australian Pharmaceutical Manufacturers' Association) to the committee of the PBAC, prompting the immediate resignation of the Chair of the committee, Emeritus Professor Don Birkett, and leading to the refusal of five of the other committee members to be reappointed.

Career after politics
In 2002, Wooldridge's contract with the Royal Australian College of General Practitioners was terminated due to allegations from the Australian Medical Association and the Federal Opposition that his involvement in the allocation of the $5,000,000 as well with his recent retirement as Health Minister represented a conflict of interest; in 2003 the parties settled and Wooldridge received a $382,500 payout. In 2006, Wooldrige was appointed 'Lead Independent Director' of the ASX listed Australian Pharmaceuticals Industry Limited. In September 2009, Wooldrige was invited to join a panel hosted by CSL Limited "a major manufacturer [of flu vaccine] in a US$2 billion influenza industry" hosted by the company to dispel myths about swine flu vaccination

Wooldridge has served on the Boards of Resonance Health Ltd, Dia-b Tech Limited (resigned in 2009, company since de-listed) and a Director of CogState Ltd. He is currently Chairman of Neurosciences Australia, Healthsource Australia (Ministerial Advisory Committee on AIDS, Sexual Health and Hepatitis), the CRC for Mental Health and the Oral Health Cooperative Research Centre. He is also Associate Professor at the University of Melbourne.

In December 2013, Wooldridge and four other directors of Australian Property Custodian Holdings Ltd (APCHL) were found liable by the Federal Court for breaching their duties as officers of APCHL.  APCHL was the responsible entity of the Prime Retirement and Aged Care Property Trust (Prime Trust), a managed investment scheme which owned retirement villages in Queensland, NSW and Victoria. APCHL collapsed in 2010 when administrators were appointed owing investors approximately $550 million. On 2 December 2014 he was banned as a company director for more than two years over his role in Prime Trust. Other directors, including founder Bill Lewski, received bans up to 15 years.

Wooldridge has also served on the board of the anti-wind energy activism organisation, the Waubra Foundation, along with other prominent anti-wind energy activists, including Sarah Laurie, Peter Mitchell, and Kathy Russell. The Waubra Foundation promotes the view that wind turbines cause ill health. Wooldridge and family are objectors to the Bald Hills wind farm in Gippsland Victoria.

Michael Wooldridge is the brother of Mary Wooldridge, Mental Health Minister in the Victorian State Government 2010–14.

References

External links
Department of Health and Aging, Speeches and press releases from January 2001 to November 2001
 

|

20th-century Australian medical doctors
Members of the Cabinet of Australia
Members of the Australian House of Representatives for Casey
Members of the Australian House of Representatives for Chisholm
Members of the Australian House of Representatives
1956 births
Living people
Liberal Party of Australia members of the Parliament of Australia
People from Ballarat
Medical doctors from Melbourne
Politicians from Melbourne
Monash University alumni
People educated at Scotch College, Melbourne
21st-century Australian politicians
20th-century Australian politicians
Government ministers of Australia
Australian Ministers for Health